The Green Bay East–Green Bay West football rivalry is a high school football rivalry between Green Bay East High School and Green Bay West High School, two public high schools in Green Bay, Wisconsin. Played annually since 1905 (other than 1906 and 2020, when the games were cancelled and postponed respectively), it is Wisconsin's longest-running consecutively-played high school football rivalry. The teams first met unofficially in 1895, but did not begin playing annually until ten years later. For much of the early 20th century, the rivalry game was one of the most popular events of the year in Green Bay due to East and West being the only city high schools, drawing crowds that exceeded those of the fledgling Green Bay Packers. 
With the addition of Southwest High School in 1964 and Preble High School in 1965, enrollments at East and West declined along with the town-wide popularity of the game, but East and West continued to meet, celebrating 100 years of games in 2005. East has led the series four times (1905-1910, 1922–1952, 1979, 2003–present), and currently leads overall . West has led the series three times (1912-1920, 1954–1977, 1981–2001) and their longest period of dominance stretched from 1942 to 1962, where they won all but three games. After back-and-forth victories in the mid-1980s to the mid-1990s, East has won all but three games since 1998, and set a record for largest victory (70–0) in the schools' 2018 meeting.  Many players from the earlier days of the rivalry went on to play in the National Football League, mostly for the Packers in their earliest years. Two Pro Football Hall of Fame members played in the East–West rivalry: quarterback Arnie Herber (West), and Curly Lambeau (East), who was inducted as a Packers coach.

History

Pre-rivalry, 1895–1901 
Founded in 1856 and 1890 respectively, Green Bay East and West are Green Bay's original and oldest high schools. In the mid-1890s, following the opening of West and the move of East from its original building, the schools began to organize football teams, first with East in 1896 and West following in 1898. Before the official formation of the teams, the two schools played an informal game in 1895 that ended in an 8–8 tie. According to Cliff Christl, a Milwaukee Journal Sentinel reporter and team historian for the Green Bay Packers, the first year a formal game was considered was 1898, but the proposals were unsuccessful. A game was scheduled in 1901, but was vetoed by Green Bay's board of education, which felt the game was not in the best interests of the schools.

Official start, 1905–1919 

The first official meeting occurred on November 30, 1905, at Green Bay's Hagemeister Park. East won 21–0, with some later sources claiming the score was 22–0. According to Christl, attendance at the first game was between 100 and 500 spectators. The following year, amidst a nationwide outcry against the violent nature of football, Green Bay's school board dissolved the programs at both schools. Though they would later reverse the decision, only East fielded a team that year and the game was not played. The series resumed in 1907 and continued uninterrupted. Once the series continued as a regular event, it became "a homecoming of sorts for college students who attended the two high schools." Beginning in 1908, the games were relegated to the city's disused minor league baseball field at Hagemeister, known as the League Ball Grounds. Despite fears of the series' cancellation due to fights during and after the 1908 game, the series continued and West won its first game in 1909. West would then win seven straight games until East, with the aid of Curly Lambeau (who would help found the Green Bay Packers three years later), won the 1916 game. Despite fears that the 1918 game would be cancelled due to the Spanish flu (and indeed it was postponed three times), the series continued.

Bigger than the Packers, 1920–1949 
By 1920, the popularity of the rivalry game continued to grow. The Green Bay Press-Gazette began devoting full-page sports previews to the game five years earlier (doing so until 1943), and two games in this decade saw higher attendance than the Packers, who were beginning a fierce rivalry with the Chicago Bears themselves. Curly Lambeau coached East's teams during the early part of the decade, and oversaw the development of Jim Crowley as a quarterback at a time when passing was not a widely used strategy. "I remember the West fans didn't like it," recalled Lambeau in a later interview, "They said, 'Run the ball. That's not football.'" Beginning in 1920, the game's date changed to November 11, and would remain so for seven of the next sixteen games. In 1923, the schools joined organized play in the new Fox River Valley Conference, and the conference's first seven football championships were won by either East or West. That year as well, the game's location switched to Bellevue Park, another baseball field that served the temporary home of the Packers due to the construction of the new East High School building on the site of Hagemeister Park. Once the new building was completed, both the Packers and the East–West rivalry game would call City Stadium, built on the campus of the new high school, home for many years. The 1933 game was the first of three ties in the series, ending with a score of 7–7. After 1930, the schools moved the game back to Armistice Day from Thanksgiving, citing near-zero°F temperatures as a reason for the change.

In the early 1940s, the generally innocuous antics of the school rivalries began to become more serious. Shortly before the 1942 game, groups of students rioted and looted in the downtown area, leading one police officer to declare that the student riots were "the worst in Green Bay history." After threats to cancel the rivalry games based on the violent behavior, the situation relaxed until 1948, when a similar wave of vandalism struck the city on the eve of an East–West game. In the Press-Gazette's view, the fights were nothing new, but the more violent conduct resulted from the games occurring at night.

Decline in popularity and conference expansion, 1950s–1980s 
The 1950s were at once the peak of attendance for the East–West games and the beginning of their eventual downturn. The 1952 and 1953 games drew crowds of 14,047 and 15,071, beating out Packers exhibition games in Milwaukee, and coming close to exceeding Packer attendance at City Stadium, which drew over 16,000 fans. After 1954, the number of fans dropped below 10,000 and would only exceed 6,000 fans once more. After another riot at the 1954 games that caused property damage and injured both a policeman and a bystander, the games were moved from nighttime to Saturday afternoon, and remained at that time for the next 25 years. The 1957 game was the first played at the current-day Lambeau Field, known then as "New City Stadium." East coach Gene Bray considered the move to Lambeau Field a key reason for declining attendance due to the larger stadium and lack of home-field feeling: "You'd play before 4,000 to 5,000 people and you didn't feel like there was anybody at the game."

In the mid-1960s, the Fox River Valley Conference admitted two more schools, Green Bay Southwest in 1964 and Preble High School in 1965. According to Christl, school officials attempted to create new rivalries – East against Preble and West against Southwest – "at the expense of the East–West game." With the addition of the new teams, the East–West game was also no longer scheduled for the final week of the regular season. The venue for the games also changed slightly during these decades, rotating between the east (City Stadium) and west (Lambeau Field) sides of the city until the late 1970s, when the west-side venue changed to West's newly constructed Del Marcelle Stadium.

As a testament to the game's shrinking popularity, the Press-Gazette failed to send a reporter to the 1976 and 1979 games, an action that, according to Christl, was unprecedented.

Current day, 1990s to present 
Despite declining enrollments and loss of athletes to other fall sports, the game continued strong for many years. In 1999, East broke a then 46-year-old scoring record, defeating West 55–7. The teams celebrated 100 years of games in 2005, and then-US Representative Mark Green commemorated the 100th game in a session of the House. In 2009, West won its first rivalry game since 1997 (the 1997 win remaining the last time West had a margin of victory larger than one score), snapping East's record winning streak of 11 games. In the teams' 2018 meeting, East again broke the margin-of-victory record, defeating West 70–0. For the first time since 1906, the rivalry game was not played in 2020 due to the ongoing COVID-19 pandemic, but was postponed to the spring along with all other football activities.

Game results 
Data from 1905 to 2005 taken from West vs. East. Post-2005 data taken from WisSports.net.

NFL alumni

Notes

References

Citations

Bibliography

Green Bay, Wisconsin
1905 establishments in Wisconsin
Recurring sporting events established in 1905